Remo Williams: The Prophecy is an American action-adventure television pilot from 1988. It is based on The Destroyer pulp paperback series by Warren Murphy and Richard Sapir, and is a spin-off of the 1985 movie Remo Williams: The Adventure Begins and incorporates footage from the movie in the opening credits. It stars Jeffrey Meek as Remo Williams, and Roddy McDowall as Chiun. It is loosely based on the 1983 novella "The Day Remo Died". It was directed by Christian I. Nyby II and the teleplay written by Steven Hensley and J. Miyoko Hensley.

Plot 
Set one year after the events of the feature film, Chiun feels that Remo is becoming complacent because of his abilities, so he hires a professional hit-man to teach Remo a lesson. What Chiun doesn't know is that the hit-man wants to replace Remo as Chiun's student and will stop at nothing to achieve his goal.

Cast
 Jeffrey Meek as CURE Agent Remo Williams
 Roddy McDowall as Master of Sinanju Chiun
 Stephen Elliott as CURE Director Harold W. Smith
 Carmen Argenziano as Tony 
 Judy Landers as "Taffy"
 Andy Romano as Derek Boland, The Assassin

Production

Music
Craig Safan, who scored the movie, returned to provide the music for the pilot; his score was later released by Intrada Records (paired with Safan's score for the TV movie Mission Of The Shark: The Saga Of The U.S.S. Indianapolis).

Broadcast
The television pilot had not been seen since 1988 until the Encore cable television channel began airing it in the summer of 2009.

New TV series
On December 8, 2022, it was announced that Gordon Smith will be adapting a TV series version of The Destroyer for Sony Pictures Television with Adrian Askarieh executive producing.

References

External links
 

1988 television films
1988 films
Television pilots not picked up as a series
Television series by Lionsgate Television
Television shows based on American novels
Television sequel films
Films directed by Christian I. Nyby II